| tries = {{#expr:
 7 + 12 + 9 + 8 + 10 + 6
 + 7 + 10 + 5 + 7 + 8 + 12
 + 8 + 8 + 4 + 10 + 10 + 10
 + 2
}}
| top point scorer   =  Lewis Minikin(Yorkshire)50 points
| top try scorer     =  Leo Fielding(Gloucestershire) Tom Grimes(Lancashire) Alex Ducker(Cornwall)4 tries each
| prevseason         = 2018
| nextseason         = 2020
}}

The 2019 Bill Beaumont County Championship Division 1 was the 119th version of the annual, English rugby union, County Championship organised by the Rugby Football Union (RFU) for the top tier English counties.  Each county drew its players from rugby union clubs from the third tier and below of the English rugby union league system (typically National League 1, National League 2 North or National League 2 South).  The counties were divided into two regional sections with the winners of each meeting in the final held at Twickenham Stadium.  Lancashire were the reigning champions having defeated Hertfordshire in the previous year's final.

At the end of the group stage, Cheshire overcame stiff challenges from Lancashire and Yorkshire to top Division 1 North.  Although they beat Yorkshire in a razor tight game during round 2, they had to rely on the same side to beat favourites Lancashire on the final match day, before they were assured of a place in the competition final.  The tournament structure was perhaps slightly unkind to Yorkshire as they had to play the top two sides, while Cheshire and Lancashire avoided playing one another.  Cornwall made amends for a terrible tournament the previous year by topping Division 1 South with an resounding victory over Hertfordshire being probably the most impressive of their three wins.  Again, due to the rather bizarre tournament structure the top two sides in the group did not meet, although Gloucestershire failed to get the 100% record needed to qualify for the final, thanks to a defeat against Kent.

In an incredibly tight Twickenham final Cornwall defeated Cheshire 14–12.  Cornwall had a 7–0 lead at the end of the first half thanks to a solo Alex Ducker converted try (his 4th of the tournament), when a moment of madness just before half-time saw Cornish scrum-half, Jack Oulton, red carded for an off-the-ball incident.  The second half was all Cheshire as they looked to get back into the game against the 14 men of Cornwall, scoring two tries to eventually take a 12–7 lead with 10 minutes remaining.  With a Cheshire win looking imminent, Cornwall were awarded a penalty inside the Cheshire 22.  What followed was a series of Cornwall penalties and scrums, as Cheshire were reduced to 13 men for repeated infringements as the game went into injury time.  Eight minutes into injury, the ball finally left the scrum and was found by Cornwall's Seti Raumakita, who dodged several tackles to go over for a try to make it 12-12.  With the last kick of the game Matthew Shepherd held his nerve to kick the conversion and win Cornwall the 2019 County Championship, and their sixth overall.

Competition format

The 2019 Bill Beaumont County Championship Division 1 consists of twelve county sides, with six counties in the northern group, and six in the southern group.  Each county plays three games per group, which means that certain counties get two home games, while others just the one home game.  The RFU have taken fixtures from the previous year into account so that county sides that only played one home game in that competition now get two games and vice versa.  At the end of the group stage the top teams with the best record from each group (north and south) advance to the final held on 2 June 2019 at Twickenham Stadium.  It is the top tier of county championship rugby.

Promotion into the division and relegation from it occurs every two seasons, with accumulated points taken into consideration.  At the end of the 2017–18 season, East Midlands (north) and Surrey (south) were relegated due to pool results accumulated over the 2017 and 2018 competitions, although in East Midlands' case they actually took voluntary relegation due to difficulties in getting the top eligible clubs in their union to provide players for future competitions.  They are replaced by Durham (north) and Hampshire (south), who were the highest ranked counties during the 2017 and 2018 Division 2 competitions, with Durham being the 2018 champions.   This also means that there will be no promotion or relegation until the end of the 2020 competition.

Participating counties and ground locations

Group stage

Division 1 North

Round 1

Round 2

Round 3

Division 1 South

Round 1

Round 2

Round 3

Final

Total season attendances
Does not include final at Twickenham which is a neutral venue and involves teams from all three county divisions on the same day

Individual statistics
 Note that points scorers includes tries as well as conversions, penalties and drop goals.  Appearance figures also include coming on as substitutes (unused substitutes not included).  Statistics also include final.

Top points scorers

Top try scorers

Competition records

Team
Largest home win — 56 points
59 – 3 Yorkshire at home to Northumberland on 4 May 2019
Largest away win — 66 points
73 – 7 Lancashire away to Durham County on 4 May 2019
Most points scored — 73 points
73 – 7 Lancashire away to Durham County on 4 May 2019
Most tries in a match — 11
Lancashire away to Durham County on 4 May 2019
Most conversions in a match — 9
Lancashire away to Durham County on 4 May 2019
Most penalties in a match — 4
Yorkshire away to Lancashire on 18 May 2019
Most drop goals in a match — 1
Lancashire at home to Yorkshire on 18 May 2019

Attendances
Highest — 3,500
Cheshire v Cornwall on 2 June 2019 (Final)
Lowest — 247
Cheshire at home to Eastern Counties on 4 May 2019
Highest Average Attendance — 1,780
Cornwall
Lowest Average Attendance — 250
Kent

Player
Most points in a match — 29
 Leo Fielding for Gloucestershire at home to Devon on 4 May 2019
Most tries in a match — 3 (3)
 Leo Fielding for Gloucestershire at home to Devon on 4 May 2019
 Tom Grimes for Lancashire away to Durham County on 4 May 2019
 Henry Roberts for Yorkshire at home to Northumberland on 4 May 2019
Most conversions in a match — 9
 Chris Johnson for Lancashire away to Durham County on 4 May 2019
Most penalties in a match — 4
 Lewis Minikin for Yorkshire away to Lancashire on 18 May 2019
Most drop goals in a match — 1
 Chris Johnson for Lancashire at home to Yorkshire on 18 May 2019

Notes

See also
 English rugby union system
 Rugby union in England

References

External links
 NCA Rugby

2019